Road Trip is a 2000 American road sex comedy film directed by Todd Phillips and written by Scot Armstrong and Phillips. The film stars Breckin Meyer, Seann William Scott, Paulo Costanzo, and DJ Qualls as four college friends who embark on an  road trip to retrieve an illicit tape mistakenly mailed to a girlfriend.

Plot
A college student, Barry, gives a tour of his college to prospective students and their families as he relates a story about his friends to the visitors.

Josh Parker and Tiffany Henderson are childhood friends turned high school sweethearts, and try for a long-distance relationship as he goes to the University of Ithaca and she goes to the University of Austin. Eventually their long-distance relationship begins to deteriorate. Josh becomes insecure when he can't regularly reach Tiffany by the phone. Fearing infidelity, Josh begins sending Tiffany video taped messages.

Josh asks his friend, Rubin, to mail his latest tape to Tiffany before leaving for his Ancient Philosophy class. Josh's Ancient Philosophy professor tells him he needs a B+ on his mid-term to pass the class. Josh's best friend, E.L., convinces Josh to stop worrying about Tiffany and notice the beautiful Beth Wagner. Beth is in love with Josh much to the chagrin of Jacob, the self-important Ancient Philosophy T.A. who is obsessed with her. Later, E.L. throws a party where he auctions off several female students, including Beth. Scared of Jacob, she convinces Josh to outbid him. Josh and Beth escape to his room and record themselves having sex on his camcorder.

The next morning, Josh tells his friends that he slept with Beth. When his friends don’t believe him, Josh mentions that he has ‘evidence.’  Josh’s friends immediately play his camcorder tape expecting to see Josh and Beth having sex, only to find love letters and songs performed for Tiffany.  Josh believes that Rubin mailed the sex tape to Tiffany. Josh then hears a voicemail from Tiffany saying that she hasn't called as her grandfather has died and she will be away from school until Monday.

With E.L. and Rubin, Josh asks Kyle to tag along on a road trip, as he needs his car. Kyle is a shy loner who lives in constant fear of his overly strict father, Earl Edwards, the car's owner. They head out to drive the 1,800 miles to Austin and back in three days, leaving their friend Barry to take care of Mitch, their snake.

After leaving the interstate in Bedford for what they thought was a "shortcut", they find a small bridge collapsed, realizing they will waste five hours backtracking. E.L. and Rubin convince them to jump the gap. Kyle objects but they proceed. They make it across, but the car is wrecked. They continue on foot, stopping at a motel. Rubin tries to buy marijuana from the unsympathetic motel clerk, but is informed that Kyle's credit card is maxed out. Looking for transportation, E.L. persuades a blind woman, Brenda, at a school for the blind, into letting him take a bus for 'repairs', and they resume the journey.

Meanwhile, Kyle's father, Earl, discovers the card is maxed. Believing he's been kidnapped, Earl begins searching for Kyle when told by the police that the car was found wrecked and he is missing. They have a series of misadventures on the way: Kyle loses his virginity at a fraternity; Josh and E.L. raise money making deposits at a sperm bank, where E.L. is assisted by an attractive nurse; and they visit Barry's grandparents, where Rubin gets high with Barry's grandfather. As Josh's books were destroyed in the car wreck, he calls his professor to ask for an extension on his midterm exam. Jacob answers the phone, impersonating the professor and granting a fake extension.

While Barry feeds the snake, Beth comes looking for Josh; he tells her Josh has feelings for her. Jacob walks in, telling her Josh is about to fail Philosophy (as he was led to believe he could retake the exam). Mitch bites Barry's hand, causing a vicious struggle, ending with Mitch landing on Jacob, squeezing his neck until he loses consciousness.

Finally getting to Austin and Tiffany's dorm, Josh intercepts the tape, just as she arrives. Earl also bursts in, furious over the car and the credit card, threatening to drag Kyle back with him. Kyle finally stands up to him, stating that he is going back to school with his friends. Earl assaults him and a mini-riot ensues.

Josh and Tiffany retreat to talk, then Beth calls to warn him (he has 48 hours to get back to school or else he will fail his midterm, the course and possibly be kicked out of college – Jacob tricked him). While Josh talks on the phone, Tiffany starts to watch the tape, which luckily is nothing but Barry mooning the camera. She and Josh agree to break up, remaining friends. Then Josh and crew rush back, just in time to take his midterm – with a little help from Beth, who called in a bomb threat.

As Barry closes the movie by completing the visitors' tour, he confirms that: Josh passed the course; Josh and Beth are still together (happily making videos); Jacob eventually dies as result of leading a cult staging a mass suicide, which no one but himself carried out;  Rubin became a successful marijuana cultivator; E.L., inspired by his sperm donation, began dating a pre-med student; and Kyle reconciled with his father. The credits roll while Barry dry humps a mother from the tour group, in the middle of campus.

Cast

 Breckin Meyer as Josh Parker
 Seann William Scott as E.L. Faldt
 Paulo Costanzo as Rubin Carver
 DJ Qualls as Kyle Edwards
 Amy Smart as Beth Wagner
 Rachel Blanchard as Tiffany Henderson, Josh's long-distance girlfriend
 Tom Green as Barry Manilow, the college tour guide and narrator of the film
 Anthony Rapp as Jacob Schultz
 Fred Ward as Earl Edwards
 Andy Dick as Motel Clerk
 Ethan Suplee as Ed Bradford
 Jaclyn DeSantis as Heather
 Jessica Cauffiel as Wrong Tiffany Henderson
 Mia Amber Davis as Rhonda
 Mary Lynn Rajskub as Blind Brenda
 Kohl Sudduth as Mark
 Wendell B. Harris Jr. as Professor Anderson
 Rini Bell as Carla, Tiffany's roommate
 Edmund Lyndeck as Jack Manilow, Barry's grandfather
 Ellen Albertini Dow as Mrs. Manilow, Barry's grandmother
 Horatio Sanz as French Toast Guy
 Rhoda Griffis as Tour Group Mom
 Jimmy Kimmel as Corky the dog (voice)
 Todd Phillips as Clayton
Marla Sucharetza as Sperm Bank Nurse

Production
The fictional 'University of Ithaca' is based on both Ithaca College and Cornell University, each located in Ithaca, New York. Filming took place from October 16, 1999 to December 27, 1999 on the campuses of Woodward Academy, Georgia Tech, Emory University, and the University of Georgia. The university seen in a flyover in the opening scene is actually Harvard University; the same footage was later used in the film Old School in 2003. The diner scene was shot in Lawrenceville, Georgia at the Gwinnett Diner, as it says on the coffee mugs. One of the final scenes of the tour was filmed at Founders Park at the University of Southern California.

Release

Critical reception

Review aggregation website Rotten Tomatoes gives Road Trip an approval rating of 57% based on 93 reviews, with an average rating of 5.3/10. The site's critics consensus reads: "Some humor is hit or miss, depending on the audience tastes, but the movie is funny overall. Mixed reviews for the cast, especially for MTV's Tom Green." Metacritic assigned the film a weighted average score of 55 out of 100 based on 32 critics, indicating "mixed or average reviews".

At the 2000 Stinkers Bad Movie Awards, Green won both Worst Supporting Actor and Most Unfunny Comic Relief for his role in both this film and Charlie's Angels. The film itself also received a nomination for Oldest Looking Teenagers but lost to Remember the Titans.

Box office
The film opened on May 19, 2000, alongside Dinosaur and Small Time Crooks; it was at No. 3 at the North American box office, making US$15,484,004, in its opening weekend.

Sequel

A direct-to-video sequel entitled Beer Pong was released on August 11, 2009, this time by Paramount Famous Productions as Paramount Pictures had acquired DreamWorks' back catalog in its (since undone) 2006 purchase of the company. Only two of the original cast or crew appear in the sequel film, DJ Qualls as Kyle Edwards and Rhoda Griffis as Tour Group Mom.

See also
 "Road Trip" (soundtrack)

References

External links

 
 
 
 

2000 films
2000s comedy road movies
2000s road movies
2000s teen sex comedy films
American road movies
American sex comedy films
American teen comedy films
American comedy road movies
DreamWorks Pictures films
2000s English-language films
Films about fraternities and sororities
Films directed by Todd Phillips
Films set in Austin, Texas
Films set in New York (state)
Films shot in Georgia (U.S. state)
Films shot in Los Angeles
Films shot in Massachusetts
Films shot in New York (state)
Films with screenplays by Todd Phillips
Films with screenplays by Scot Armstrong
The Montecito Picture Company films
2000 directorial debut films
2000 comedy films
2000s American films